005.1999.06 is the fifth studio album by the South Korean singer and actress Uhm Jung-hwa. It spawned four hit singles and earned Uhm Golden Disk Awards. First released by Universal Music Korea on June 17, 1999, the album explores the dance genre, ranging from 1970s style disco to house dance, and beyond. Uhm worked with various South Korean producers and songwriters on the album, including , Joo Young-hoon, and Jung Jae-hyung among others.

The album debuted at number one on the South Korean album chart with the first-month sales over 324,000 copies. In December 1999, South Korean newspapers reported that the album had sold over 550,000 copies, and is the sixth best-selling album of the year.

Reception

Critical response
Reviews for the album have generally been positive. Yang Seong-hui of Munhwa Ilbo said, "Uhm now has an indisputable position in the dance music industry following the success of her songs, 'Poison', 'Invitation', and 'I Don't Know'." However, Park Eun-joo of Hankook Ilbo cited an anonymous source, criticising her for using "too much sex-appeal" but Park also said that Uhm's performances were positively received by the public.

Public response
This album is the most commercially successful album of Uhm's career to date. Two songs ("I Don't Know", "Festival") from the album topped the charts and she won numerous important music awards in South Korea, including Golden Disk Awards and Mnet Asian Music Awards.

Track listing

Accolades

Awards and nominations

Music programme awards

Charts

Monthly charts

Yearly charts

References

1999 albums
Uhm Jung-hwa albums
Universal Music Group albums
Korean-language albums